Bridget Kelly (born April 8, 1986) is an American singer and songwriter from New York City. In 2008, Kelly, a pop and R&B recording artist, who has written songs for fellow American singers such as Kelly Clarkson, secured a recording contract with American rapper and hip-hop mogul Jay-Z's record label Roc Nation.

Biography

1986–2010: Early life and career beginnings 

Bridget Kelly, who is of a biracial background of Bahamian and Irish descent, was born on April 8, 1986, in New York City. She is a graduate of Fiorello H. LaGuardia High School of Music & Art and Performing Arts in Manhattan. In 2008, she signed a record deal with Jay-Z's Roc Nation. Kelly has regularly filled in for Alicia Keys, when performing the song "Empire State of Mind" with Jay-Z, including performances on the Friday Night with Jonathan Ross, as well as Later...with Jools Holland show, the Coldplay, Viva la Vida tour, and the 9/11 memorial service. Kelly also performed with Jay Z during a performance at the MTV Europe Music Awards 2009. She performed "Empire State of Mind" at Coachella Valley Music and Arts Festival as well as Bonnaroo Music Festival in summer 2010, with Jay-Z. Kelly also performed "Empire State of Mind" with Jay-Z on Saturday Night Live on May 8, 2010, as well as Rock am Ring on June 4 and T in the Park on June 12, 2010. She subsequently performed with Jay-Z during "Empire State of Mind" at Peace & Love in Borlänge, Sweden. Also at Summer Sonic 2010 in Chiba, Japan in August 2010 at Chiba Marine Stadium. Also at Yankee Stadium, September 13, 2010.

Kelly made her first magazine cover appearance in the September 2010 issue of Honey Magazine. In the interview to go along with the cover shoot, she describes her music as a fusion of R&B, soul and rock with influences coming from Alicia Keys, Alanis Morissette and Pink.

2011–2013: Every Girl and Cut to... Bridget Kelly 

In early 2011, Kelly and her production team had approached Frank Ocean to write a song for her debut studio album. The song in question eventually became "Thinking Bout Forever", which Kelly commented; "it's sort of a vulnerable track and I wanted everyone to feel me on it." In July 2011, Roc Nation stated on the official site that Kelly is closing her album up and the first single would be the Frank Ocean-penned "Thinking Bout Forever". On July 28, 2011, Ocean leaked his demo version of the song onto his tumblr account, with the title reading "Thinking Bout You". The song was then promptly taken down by Ocean.

Kelly has worked with high-profile producers such as The-Dream, Ne-Yo, Jerry Wonda, James Fauntleroy II, Ryan Leslie, and Shea Taylor for her debut studio album. Prior to the album's release, Kelly released her first extended play (EP), titled Every Girl, on October 19, 2011. Kelly's version of "Thinkin Bout You" found its way onto the EP. Kelly was ultimately fine with Ocean's decision, however she noted that she didn't like how most people thought Ocean's version was the original, and how people assumed her version was a cover version. About the confusion of the track, Kelly stated: "Now that push has come to shove, we're going to let the song have a life of its own. I think it's an amazing, well-written record. Frank Ocean is incredibly talented, I will never say anything against that. But at the same time, you know, he's going to do what he wants to do, he's an artist as well."

In August 2012, her debut single "Special Delivery", was released to Urban radio stations. Her second single
"Street Dreamin", features American rapper Kendrick Lamar and was released on May 21, 2013. Both songs were Top 40 hits on the Mediabase Urban Airplay charts. On November 26, 2013, Kelly announced she would be releasing her second EP and revealed her debut album was pushed back to a 2014 release. The EP includes six tracks as well as contributions from Jerry Wonda ("Goosebumps"), Pop Wansel, Sam Dew, Elijah Blake, and Cri$tyle. "I speak a lot about love and my feelings on these songs," said Bridget of the follow-up to her 2011 EP Every Girl. "I speak to those who have been in relationships, the good and the bad, and that in the midst of turmoil, finding something you can smile about." The EP, titled Cut to... Bridget Kelly, includes her debut single "Special Delivery" and was made available as a free download on December 17, via her official website.

2014–present: Parting Ways with Roc Nation and All or Nothing 
In June 2014, Kelly confirmed her split after six years with Roc Nation and she is about releasing her album independently. After the split, Kelly released two singles, "I Won't Cry" and "Almost More", which are the exclusive previews of her upcoming music. She is working with Jerry Wonda on the new album and changed the album title from Something Different to All or Nothing, which is set to release in 2017. She appeared on Love and Hip Hop: Hollywood from 2017 to 2018 as a supporting cast member for two seasons. In October 2020, Kelly began hosting the See, The Thing Is Podcast on the Joe Budden Network alongside cohosts Mandii B and Olivia Dope.
The podcast now only stars Bridget Kelly and Mandii B after Olivia Dope claimed Joe Budden sexually harassed her during taping, forcing her to quit her position on the show.

Discography

Studio albums 
All or Nothing (2017)
Reality Bites (2018)

EPs 
Every Girl (2011)
Cut to... Bridget Kelly (2013)
Summer of 17 (2015)
The Great Escape (2019)

Singles

As a lead artist

As featured artist

Guest appearances

References

External links 

 
 

1986 births
Living people
Fiorello H. LaGuardia High School alumni
Singers from New York City
American contemporary R&B singers
Songwriters from New York (state)
Roc Nation artists
American women pop singers
African-American women songwriters
21st-century American women singers
21st-century American singers